Hass may refer to:

 Hass (Ottoman)
 Hass (surname)
 Hass (town), a town in Syria
 Hass avocado, a type of avocado named after its cultivator, Rudolph Hass
 Hass Petroleum, an investment company
 Humanities, arts, and social sciences
 Home Assistant, the home automation software

See also
Haas (disambiguation)
Has (disambiguation)